Neninka is a rural locality (a selo) and the administrative center of Neninsky Selsoviet, Soltonsky District, Altai Krai, Russia. The population was 933 as of 2013. There are 14 streets.

Geography 
Neninka is located 31 km southwest of Solton (the district's administrative centre) by road. Karabinka is the nearest rural locality.

References 

Rural localities in Soltonsky District